Henry Junior Plazas Mendoza (born 12 December 1992) is a Venezuelan footballer who plays as a defender for  Boyacá Chicó

References

External links

1992 births
Living people
Estudiantes de Mérida players
Aragua FC players
Zulia F.C. players
Venezuelan Primera División players
Venezuelan footballers
Association football defenders
People from Mérida, Mérida
21st-century Venezuelan people